Joe Palumbo may refer to:

 Joe Palumbo (American football) (1929–2013), American football guard
 Joe Palumbo (baseball) (born 1994), American professional baseball pitcher